Nord-Vågsøy Church (historically: Vågsøy Church or Vågsøy Chapel) is a parish church of the Church of Norway in Kinn Municipality in Vestland county, Norway. It is located in the village of Raudeberg on the northeastern coast of the island of Vågsøy. It is the church for the Nord-Vågsøy parish which is part of the Nordfjord prosti (deanery) in the Diocese of Bjørgvin. The white, concrete church was built in a long church style in 1960 by the architect Ole Halvorsen. The church seats about 420 people.

History
The earliest existing historical records of the church date back to 1599, but it was likely built in 1580. Originally, it was called Vågsøy Chapel. The island of Vågsøy was historically part of the prestegjeld (parish) of Selje. The chapel was served by the priest from Selje Church approximately once each month. The chapel was a small wooden building in a long church design. The main doors to the church were on far west end of the north side of the church. The church initially had a sod roof.

In 1847, the local parish priest, Koren, proposed a new church at Raudeberg. The last worship service in the chapel was on 16 May 1853. After this, the building was sold to the merchant Ole Smidt from Måløy. The new church was called Vågsøy Church until 1907 when a new church was built in Måløy. This church was then renamed Nord-Vågsøy (North-Vågsøy) and the other church was named Sør-Vågsøy (South-Vågsøy) church. The new church was in use until it burned down in 1945 during World War II. After the war, there was much to rebuild all over Norway, and so this church was not rebuilt until 1960. The new church was consecrated on 24 October 1960 by the Bishop Ragnvald Indrebø. The new church is constructed out of concrete. It sits on the side of a hill, so it has a partial basement underneath which includes utility rooms, a kitchen, meeting rooms, bathrooms, and storage. The church cost  to construct.

Media gallery

See also
List of churches in Bjørgvin

References

Kinn
Churches in Vestland
Long churches in Norway
Concrete churches in Norway
20th-century Church of Norway church buildings
Churches completed in 1960
1580 establishments in Norway